Metius harpaloides is a species of ground beetle in the subfamily Pterostichinae. It was described by John Curtis in 1839.

References

Metius (genus)
Beetles described in 1839